Pål Sæthrang (10 June 1945 – 18 September 2004) was a Norwegian football striker.

His father Paul Sæthrang was also capped for Norway. They were the second father-son combination to be capped, after Rolf Pedersen and Rolf Birger Pedersen.

Pål Sæthrang played for Skeid between 1963 and 1969, becoming league champion in 1966 and cup champion in 1963 and 1965. He represented Norway as an under-21 and senior international.

References

1945 births
2004 deaths
Footballers from Oslo
Norwegian footballers
Skeid Fotball players
Norway under-21 international footballers
Norway international footballers
Association football forwards